Harry Bertoia (March 10, 1915 – November 6, 1978) was an Italian-born American artist, sound art sculptor, and modern furniture designer.

Bertoia was born in San Lorenzo, Pordenone, Italy. At age 15, given the opportunity to move to Detroit, Harry chose to adventure to America and live with his older brother, Oreste. After learning English and the bus schedule, he enrolled in Cass Technical High School, where he studied art and design and learned the skill of handmade jewelry making ca.1930-1936. At that time, there were three jewelry and metals teachers Louise Green, Mary Davis, and Greta Pack. In 1936 he attended the Art School of the Detroit Society of Arts and Crafts, now known as the College for Creative Studies. The following year in 1937 he received a scholarship to study at the Cranbrook Academy of Art where he encountered Walter Gropius, Edmund N. Bacon, Ray and Charles Eames, and Florence Knoll for the first time.

In 2019, the Harry Bertoia Foundation launched a catalogue raisonné project, which seeks to document and research the diverse and extensive artistic practice of the artist. The goal is to provide a comprehensive record and resource of Bertoia's work, and will include his painting, graphics (including monotypes), furniture, jewelry, metalwork, sound recordings, and sculpture. An ongoing project, the Harry Bertoia Catalogue Raisonné will be available online, published in stages, and regularly updated to reflect ongoing research. It will be accessible to scholars, educators, collectors, arts professionals, and any member of the public wishing to gain a deeper understanding of Bertoia's work.

Career

Starting out as a painting student but soon being asked to reopen the metal workshop in 1939, Bertoia taught jewelry design and metal work. Later, as the war effort made metal a rare and very expensive commodity he began to focus his efforts on jewelry making, even designing and creating wedding rings for Ray Eames and Edmund Bacon's wife Ruth. When all the metal was taken up by war efforts, he became the graphics instructor. Still at Cranbrook, in 1943 he married Brigitta Valentiner, and then moved to California to work for Charles and Ray at the Molded Plywood Division of the Evans Product Company. Bertoia also learned welding techniques at Santa Monica College and began experimenting with sound sculptures. Bertoia worked there until 1946, then sold his jewelry and monotypes until obtaining work with the Electronics Naval Lab in La Jolla.
In 1950, he was invited to move to Pennsylvania to work with Hans and Florence Knoll. (Florence studied also at Cranbrook.)  During this period he designed five wire pieces that became known as the Bertoia Collection for Knoll.  Among these was the famous diamond chair, a fluid, sculptural form made from a welded lattice work of steel.

In Bertoia's own words, "If you look at these chairs, they are mainly made of air, like sculpture. Space passes right through them."

The chairs were produced with varying degrees of upholstery over their light grid-work, and they were handmade at first because a suitable mass production process could not be found. Unfortunately, the chair edge utilized two thin wires welded on either side of the mesh seat.  This design had been granted a patent to the Eames for the wire chair produced by Herman Miller. Herman Miller eventually won and Bertoia & Knoll redesigned the seat edge, using a thicker, single wire, and grinding down the edge of the seat wires at a smooth angle—the same way the chairs are still produced.   Nonetheless, the commercial success enjoyed by Bertoia's diamond chair was immediate. It was only in 2005 that Bertoia's asymmetrical chaise longue was introduced at the Milan Furniture Fair and sold out immediately.

Sound sculpture

In the mid-1950s, the chairs being produced by Knoll sold so well that the lump sum payment arrangement from Knoll allowed Bertoia to devote himself exclusively to sculpture. He ultimately produced over 50 commissioned public sculptures, many of which remain viewable. In the 1960s, he began experimenting with sounding sculptures of tall vertical rods on flat bases. He renovated the old barn into an atypical concert hall and put in about 100 of his favorite "Sonambient" sculptures. Bertoia played the pieces in a number of concerts and even produced a series of eleven albums, all entitled "Sonambient," of the music made by his art, manipulated by his hands along with the elements of nature. In the late 1990s, his daughter found a large collection of near mint condition original albums stored away on his property in Pennsylvania.  These were sold as collector's items. In 2015, these Sonambient recordings were re-issued by Important Records as a box set with a booklet of the history and previously unseen photos.

The sound sculptures are also featured on a 1975 record titled "The Sound of Sound Sculpture". 

Bertoia's work can be found in The Addison Gallery of American Art (Andover, Massachusetts), the Brooklyn Museum (New York City), the Cleveland Museum of Art, the Dallas Public Library, the Detroit Institute of Arts, the Hirshhorn Museum and Sculpture Garden (Washington D.C.), the Honolulu Museum of Art, the Kemper Museum of Contemporary Art (Kansas City, Missouri), the Nasher Sculpture Center (Dallas, Texas), the Philadelphia Museum of Art, the Reading Public Museum (Reading, Pennsylvania), the Allentown Art Museum,  Milwaukee art museum, the Smithsonian American Art Museum (Washington D.C.), the Vero Beach Museum of Art (Vero Beach, Florida), and the Walker Art Center (Minneapolis, Minnesota).

Bertoia's "Sunburst Sculpture" owned by the Joslyn Art Museum was originally installed in the Joslyn's Fountain Court.  It is now 
located in the lobby of the Milton R. Abrahams Branch of the Omaha Public Library.  Lord Palumbo owns several Bertoia works which are on display at Kentuck Knob.  Bertoia's "Sounding Sculpture" can be found in the plaza of The Aon Center, Chicago's fourth-tallest building. Another "Sounding Sculpture", considerably smaller than the one mentioned above, is featured in the Rose Terrace of the Chicago Botanic Garden, and a third very similar to the piece in Chicago called " Sounding Piece" was until 2003 on display at the Herbert F. Johnson Museum of Art at Cornell University in Ithaca, New York.  As explained in October 3, 1995 piece in the weekly "Dear Uncle Ezra" column of the university newspaper:

Dear Uncle Ezra,

What is that sound coming from the Johnson Museum? It's a pingy type sound that I guess could be some kind of wind chime but it seems like it's coming from the building itself.

— Just wondering
Dear Chiming In,

Well, it almost is coming from the building itself.  What you hear is "Sounding Piece", a sculpture by Harry Bertoia that permanently resides on the sculpture court (outdoor balcony) on the second floor of the Johnson Museum.  The chimes sway back and forth on tall rods and "ping" or "gong" into each other (depending on which chime and how hard they collide) when winds move them.  It's one of my all-time favorites, well worth a visit if you haven't seen it.  You can go out on to the sculpture court until at least the end of October.  Once winter sets in, the chimes are secured so that they won't snap in the windy, icy weather.

Uncle Ezra

The sculpture was taken off view after it was damaged in a storm in 2003 . Audiovisual footage of many of Bertoia's sound sculptures can be viewed on websites such as YouTube .

Other work
Bertoia was the sculptor commissioned to create the Marshall University fountain in Huntington, West Virginia, to honor the university's football team in the wake of the plane crash that killed them on November 14, 1970. For more information on the disaster, see Marshall University air disaster.

The 1954 Gordon Bunshaft building for Manufacturer's Hanover Trust-now JPMorgan Chase (510 Fifth Avenue at West 43rd Street, New York City) included a full building-width, second-floor screen-sculpture by Bertoia. It was dismantled and removed in 2010 by J. P. Morgan Chase.

Bertoia was also commissioned to make a screen sculpture for the Embassy of the United States in Caracas, Venezuela, in 1958. The building, located in the Chacao Municipality (former Sucre District), now serves as the headquarters of Venezuela's Ministry of the People's Power for Tourism, while the embassy was moved to a bigger site in Valle Arriba in 1995. Bertoia's sculpture, spanning the entire vertical length of the building, is still in place.  

The 'Golden Sun' was commissioned in 1967 for The Whiting, an auditorium in Flint, Michigan.  Seven feet in diameter, the spherical sculpture consists of 675 gold-plated stainless steel branches and hangs in the building's lobby.

Personal life
Bertoia fathered one son, Val, and two daughters, Lesta and Celia. One grandson and two granddaughters (one died young), and three great grandchildren have carried on his lineage.  Some members of the subsequent two generations are engaged in artistic endeavors.

Bertoia died of lung cancer in Barto, Pennsylvania, at the age of 63 on November 6, 1978.  His wife, Brigitta Valentiner, died in 2007, aged 87.

Publications 

Harry Bertoia: Sculptor  (1970), June Kompass Nelson, Wayne State University Press, 
Harry Bertoia, Printmaker: Monotypes and Other Monographics (1989), June Kompass Nelson, Wayne State University Press, 
The World of Bertoia (2003),  Nancy N. Schiffer and Val O. Bertoia, Schiffer Publishing, 
 The Life and Work of Harry Bertoia (2015), Celia Bertoia, Schiffer Publishing,

References

External links

 HarryBertoia Foundation
 Harry Bertoia Catalogue Raisonné Project
 Bertoia Studio
 Marshall University Air Disaster Memorial Site (Harry Bertoia) 
 ArtCycloPedia.Com (Harry Bertoia Online)
 Harry Bertoia's Birthplace, hosting a comprehensive Digital Library
 The Bertoia Collection

20th-century Italian male artists
Italian furniture designers
American furniture designers
Modern artists
1915 births
1978 deaths
Audiovisual artists
American male sculptors
Cass Technical High School alumni
Cranbrook Academy of Art alumni
Italian emigrants to the United States
People from Berks County, Pennsylvania
20th-century American sculptors
20th-century American male artists
Santa Monica College alumni